The Rom (Romansh: Rom; ;  in Switzerland or Rambach in South Tyrol (Italy) is a river in Switzerland and Italy. It rises in the Livigno Range of the Alps, close to the Fuorn Pass. It flows through the Val Müstair in Switzerland, and joins the Adige near the town Glurns in the Italian province of South Tyrol.

External links

 Hydrological data of Rom at Müstair - real time and historical data: waterlevel, discharge, temperature
 Rio Ram: Descrizione geomorfologica 
 Rambach: Geomorphologische Beschreibung 
 

Rivers of Switzerland
Rivers of Italy
Rivers of South Tyrol
Rivers of Graubünden
International rivers of Europe